There have been many atheists who have participated in politics or law. This is a list of atheists in politics and law. Living persons in this list are people whose atheism is relevant to their notable activities or public life, and who have publicly identified themselves as atheists.

Africa 
 Zackie Achmat (1962–): South African anti-Apartheid activist and HIV campaigner.
 Kareem Amer (1984–): Egyptian political activist.
 Alex Erwin (1948–): South African politician, the country's Minister of Public Enterprises from 2004 to 2009.
 Chris Hani (1942–1993): South African anti-Apartheid activist, General Secretary of the South African Communist Party from 1991 to 1993 and Deputy Commander of uMkhonto we Sizwe from 1987 to 1992 .
 Nadine Gordimer (1923–2014): South African anti-Apartheid political activist.
 Maikel Nabil Sanad (1985–): Egyptian political activist.
 Joe Slovo (1926–1995): South African Communist politician, leader of the South African Communist Party and leading member of the African National Congress.
 Ronnie Kasrils (1938–): South African anti-Apartheid politician.
 Richard Leakey (1944–2022): Kenyan politician, conservationist and paleoanthropologist.
 Samora Moisés Machel (1933–1986): Mozambican socialist revolutionary.
 Mengistu Haile Mariam (1937–): Ethiopian politician and military dictator.
 Kingunge Ngombale–Mwiru (1930–2018): Tanzanian politician.

Asia

Afghanistan 
 Nemat Sadat (1979–): Ex-Muslim LGBT Rights Activist, journalist and writer, former professor of American University of Afghanistan.

Cambodia 
 Pol Pot (1925–1998): Communist politician and dictator of Cambodia, which became an atheist state under his rule.

China 
 Xi Jinping (1953–): Chinese politician currently serving as General Secretary of the Chinese Communist Party, President of the People's Republic of China, and Chairman of the Central Military Commission.
 Hu Jintao (1942–): Chinese politician who was the paramount leader of the People's Republic of China from 2002 to 2012. He held the offices of General Secretary of the Communist Party from 2002 to 2012, President of the People's Republic of China from 2003 to 2012 and Chairman of the Central Military Commission from 2004 to 2012. He was a member of the Politburo Standing Committee, China's de facto top decision-making body, from 1992 to 2012.
 Jiang Zemin (1926–2022): Chinese communist politician, General Secretary of the Chinese Communist Party 1989–2002 and President of the People's Republic of China 1993–2003. In June 1999, Jiang established an extralegal department, the 6-10 Office, to expel Falun Gong from mainland China. On 20 July, security forces abducted and detained thousands of Falun Gong organizers they identified as leaders. The persecution of Falun Gong that followed was characterized a nationwide campaign of propaganda, as well as the large-scale arbitrary imprisonment and coercive reeducation of Falun Gong organizers, sometimes resulting in death.
 Deng Xiaoping (1904–1997): Chinese politician. He was the paramount leader of the People's Republic of China from 1978 until his retirement in 1989.
 Mao Zedong (1893–1976): Chinese military and political leader, Chairman of the Chinese Communist Party, who led the Chinese Communist Party to victory in the Chinese Civil War, and was the leader of the People's Republic of China from its establishment in 1949 until his death in 1976. Under his leadership, China officially became an atheist state.
 Hua Guofeng (1921–2008): Chinese politician and paramount leader of China until 1978.

India 
 Jyoti Basu (1914–2010)
 Buddhadeb Bhattacharjee (1944–)
 Manik Sarkar (1949–)
 Periyar E.V. Ramasamy, known as Periyar (1879–1973): Social reformer and politician, the 'Socrates of Southern Asia', who founded the Self-Respect Movement and Dravidar Kazhagam.
 Jawaharlal Nehru (1889–1964): India's first Prime Minister and a secular-described "scientific humanist" who disavowed belief in gods.
Sahodaran Ayyappan (1889–1969): Co-founder of the modern atheist movement in Kerala state in India, and minister in Travancore-Cochin government. 
 Goparaju Ramachandra Rao, Well known as Gora (1902–1975) Social reformer, founded Atheist Centre on the principles of positive Atheism. Participated in Indian freedom movement, preached atheism.
M.A. John (1936–2011): Leader of Indian National Congress and atheist. 
 Subhashini Ali (1947–): Marxist politician and President of the All India Democratic Women's Association.
 Kanimozhi (1968–): Politician and poet, and daughter of the Tamil Nadu Chief Minister M. Karunanidhi.
 M. Karunanidhi (1924–2018): Ex-Chief Minister of Tamil Nadu.
 M. K. Stalin (1953–): Chief Minister of Tamil Nadu since 2021.
 Manabendra Nath Roy (1887–1954): Born Narendra Nath Bhattacharya, popularly known as M. N. Roy, was a Bengali Indian revolutionary, internationally known political theorist and activist, founder of the Communist parties in Mexico and India. He later denounced communism and became an exponent of the philosophy of radical humanism.
 Bhagat Singh (1907–1931): Marxist revolutionary, wrote a pamphlet entitled Why I am an atheist.
 Harkishan Singh Surjeet (1916–2008): Politician, General Secretary of the Communist Party of India (Marxist) from 1992 to 2005 and a member of the party's Polit Bureau from 1964 to 2008.
 A. K. Gopalan (1904–1977): Communist leader from Kerala and former Leader of the Opposition (India).
 E. M. S. Namboodiripad (1909–1998): Politician, renowned socialist and a Marxist theorist, first Chief Minister of Kerala. He also became the leader of the first democratically elected communist government in the world. 
K.N. Ramachandran (1937–): Naxalite leader and General Secretary of Communist Party of India (Marxist Leninist) Red Star 
 Prakash Karat (1948–): Politician, The General Secretary of the Communist Party of India (Marxist) from 2005 to 2015.
 Siddaramaiah (1948–): Chief Minister of Karnataka elected to office in 2013.
 E. K. Nayanar (1918–2004): Politician, former Chief Minister of Kerala
 A. K. Antony (1940–): Politician, former Chief Minister of Kerala
 V. S. Achuthanandan (1923–): Politician, former Chief Minister of Kerala
 Pinarayi Vijayan (1944–): Politician, current Chief Minister of Kerala
 Kamal Haasan (1954–): Politician, President of Makkal Needhi Maiam, Actor
Manoj John (1972–): Former Naxalite and member of Communist Party of India (Marxist–Leninist) Red Star, and current Director of Atheist Alliance International, an organisation having consultative status at the United Nations.
Udhayanidhi Stalin (1977–): Politician, member of the Tamil Nadu Legislative Assembly, son of current Tamil Nadu Chief Minister, M. K. Stalin.
V.T. Balram (1978–): Indian law-maker representing Indian National Congress who supported Amnesty International in a controversy involving Hindu nationalist student organisation ABVP.
Sharad Pawar(1978–): Former Chief minister of maharashtra.

Japan 
 Hideki Tojo (1884–1948): Politician, military general, and Prime Minister of Japan from 1941 to 1944. Was raised Shinto but never really identified with the religion or any belief in gods.

Middle East 
 Uri Avnery (1923–2018): German-born Israeli journalist, left-wing peace activist, and former Knesset member.
 Ali Al Bukhaiti (1976–): Yemeni politician, journalist, and writer.
 David Ben-Gurion (1886–1973): Polish-Israeli politician; a founder and the first Prime Minister of Israel.
 Moshe Dayan (1915–1981): Israeli military leader and politician. The fourth Chief of Staff of the Israel Defense Forces (1953–58). He went on to become Defense Minister and later Foreign Minister of Israel.
 George Hawi (1938–2005): Lebanese politician and former secretary general of the Lebanese Communist Party.
 Golda Meir (1898–1978): Israeli politician who became the fourth Prime Minister of Israel.
 Yitzhak Rabin (1922–1995): Israeli politician, statesman and general. He was the fifth Prime Minister of Israel. He won the 1994 Nobel Peace Prize together with Shimon Peres and Yasser Arafat.

Mongolia
 Khorloogiin Choibalsan (1895–1952): Communist politician and dictator of Mongolia.

North Korea
 Kim Il-sung (1912–1994): Founder of North Korea and the Juche ideology, Supreme Leader from 1948 to 1994.
 Kim Jong-il (1942–2011): Supreme Leader from 1994 to 2011.
 Kim Jong-un (1983–): Supreme Leader since 2011.

Vietnam/North Vietnam
 Ho Chi Minh (1890–1969): North Vietnamese leader who served as General Secretary of the Communist Party of Vietnam from 1956 to 1960.
 Xuan Thuy (1912–1985): North Vietnamese political figure, foreign minister for North Vietnam 1963–65, official leader of the delegation to the secret talks with Henry Kissinger, and the main negotiator at the earliest meetings with Kissinger.

Oceania

Australia 
 Montague Miller (1839–1920): unionist, secularist and revolutionary socialist.
 William Trenwith (1846–1925): trade union official and labour movement politician.
 Frederick Vosper (1869–1901): newspaper journalist and proprietor, and politician, known for his ardent views and support of Australian republicanism, federalism and trade unionism.
 Sir John Latham (1877–1964): Chief Justice of Australia (1935–1952).
 Lionel Murphy (1922–1986): Justice of the High Court (1975–1986).
 Bill Hayden (1933–): Governor-General of Australia (1989–1996). Converted to Catholicism in 2018.
 Alan Carpenter (1957–): Premier of Western Australia (2006–2008).
 Julia Gillard (1961–): Prime Minister of Australia (2010–2013).

New Zealand 
 Norman Douglas (1910–1985): Labour Party politician.
 Sir Dove-Myer Robinson (1901–1989): Politician, Mayor of Auckland from 1959 to 1965 and 1968–1980.

Europe with Russia/USSR

Albania
 Ben Blushi (1969–): Politician, former minister, writer and journalist.
 Dritëro Agolli (1931–2017): Poet, writer and politician.
 Diana Çuli (1951–): Writer, journalist and politician.
 Gilman Bakalli (1967–2016): Professor, politician, pundit, and writer.
 Enver Hoxha (1908–1985): Communist ruler who declared Albania the first atheist state, and who has been identified as an "arch-atheist."
 Hysen Hoxha (1861–1934) Politician, mayor of Gjirokastër, part of the Gjirokastra delegation for the Assembly of Vlorë.

Belgium
 Elio Di Rupo (1951–): Belgian politician, social democratic Belgian prime minister between 2011 and 2014, describes himself as an atheist, rationalist and Freemason.
 Fientje Moerman (1958–): liberal politician and currently judge on the Constitutional Court of Belgium.
 Karel De Gucht (1954–): European Commissioner between 2009 and 2014.
 Dirk Verhofstadt (1955-): Belgian social liberal theorist.  
 Siegfried Bracke (1953–): President of the Chamber of Representatives between 2014 and 2019.

Denmark
 Edvard Brandes (1847–1931): Politician, critic and author, Minister of Finance 1909–1910 and 1913–1920.
 Thorvald Stauning (1873–1943): Prime minister 1924–1926 and 1929–1942.
 Vilhelm Buhl (1881–1954): Prime minister May–November 1942 and May–November 1945.
 Hans Hedtoft (1903–1955): Prime minister 1947–1950 and 1953–55.
 H. C. Hansen (1906–1960): Prime minister 1955–1960.
 Jens Otto Krag (1914–1978): Prime minister 1962–1968 and 1971–1972.

Finland
 Erkki Tuomioja (1946–): politician, Minister of Foreign Affairs 2011–2015
 Rosa Meriläinen (1975–): politician and author
 Jussi Halla-aho (1971–): Leader of the Finns Party and Member of the European Parliament (MEP)

France
 Jeannette Bougrab (1973–): Lawyer and politician.
 Georges Clemenceau (1841–1929): Statesman, physician and journalist, prime minister of France 1906–1909 and 1917–1920. Led France during World War I and was one of the major proponents of the Treaty of Versailles.
 Simone de Beauvoir (1908-1986): French writer, philosopher, political activist, feminist, socialist, and social theorist.
 Pierre Joseph Proudhon (1809–1865): Politician, mutualist philosopher and socialist. He was a member of the French Parliament, and he was the first person to call himself an "anarchist".
 Gilbert Romme (1750–1795): Politician and mathematician who developed the French Republican Calendar.
 Marie-Jean Hérault de Séchelles (1759–1794): 4th and 24th President of the National Convention. First known atheist head of state ever.
 François Hollande (1954–): President of France.
 Aristide Briand (1862–1932): French statesman who served eleven terms as Prime Minister of France during the French Third Republic.
 Anne Hidalgo (1959–): Spanish-French politician who has been serving as Mayor of Paris since 2014.
 Clémence Royer (1830–1920):  French scholar who lectured and wrote on economics, philosophy, science, and feminism.

Germany
 Sabine Jünger (1973–): German politician for The Left Party.PDS.
 Willibald Hentschel (1858–1947): German agrarian and volkisch writer and political activist.
 Martin Bormann (1900–1945): Nazi official and right-hand man of Adolf Hitler.
 Friedrich Engels (1820–1895): 19th-century philosopher and political scientist, often regarded as the co-founder of Communism.
 Hermann Göring (1893–1946): Nazi official.
 Erich Honecker (1912–1994): Communist politician and leader of East Germany.
 Karl Marx (1818–1883): 19th-century philosopher, political economist, sociologist, political theorist, often called the father of Communism.
 Friedrich Ebert (1871–1925): German politician of the Social Democratic Party (SPD) and the first president of Germany from 1919 until his death in office in 1925.
Alfred Rosenberg (1893–1946): Nazi official and leader of NSDAP Office of Foreign Affairs.
 Ali Al-Dailami (1981–): A German-Yemeni politician from DIE LINKE.
 Kurt Schumacher (1895–1952): Social democratic politician who served as chairman of the Social Democratic Party of Germany from 1946 and was the first Leader of the Opposition in the West German Bundestag from 1949 until his death.
 Carl Vogt (1817–1895): German scientist, philosopher, popularizer of science, and politician who emigrated to Switzerland.
 Julius Streicher (1885–1946): Nazi official.
 Olaf Scholz (1958–): German  politician from the Social Democratic Party that is currently serving as chancellor of Germany.
 Walter Ulbricht (1893–1973): Communist politician and leader of East Germany.
 Sahra Wagenknecht (1969–): Left-wing politician (Die Linke)
 Johann Most (1846–1906): German-American Social Democratic and then anarchist politician, newspaper editor, and orator.

Greece
 Alexis Tsipras (1974–): Leader of Syriza and Prime Minister of Greece from 26 January 2015 to 8 July 2019.
 Yanis Varoufakis (1961–): Minister of Finance from 27 January 2015 to 6 July 2015.

Ireland
 Clare Daly (1968–): United Left Alliance, Teachta Dála
 Jim Kemmy (1936–1997): Socialist politician.
 Ivana Bacik (1968–): Senator and Deputy Leader of the Seanad
 Proinsias De Rossa (1940–): Politician, former President of the Workers' Party, leader of Democratic Left, and later a senior member of the Labour Party.
 Hanna Sheehy-Skeffington (1877–1946): Suffragist and nationalist.
 Owen Sheehy-Skeffington (1909–1970): University lecturer and Senator.
 William Thompson (1775–1833): Socialist and economist.
 Joe Higgins (1949–): Socialist Party politician. In the 2011 general election he was elected to Dáil Éireann as Teachta Dála (TD) for the Dublin West constituency, having previously served in that capacity from 1997 to 2007.[1] He was also a Member of the European Parliament (MEP) for the Dublin constituency from 2009 to 2011, the first Socialist Party MEP.

Italy
 Giorgio Napolitano (1925–): politician, 11th president of Italy.
 Sandro Pertini (1896–1990): politician, 7th president of Italy.
 Giuseppe Saragat (1898–1988): politician, 5th president of Italy.
 Massimo D'Alema (1949–): politician, 53rd prime minister 1998–2000, minister of foreign affairs and deputy prime minister in the Prodi II Cabinet 2006–2008.
 Giuliano Ferrara (1952–): politician, journalist, and occasional talk show host.
 Nilde Iotti (1920–1999): politician, the first woman to become president of the Italian Chamber of Deputies for three consecutive legislatures 1979–1992.
 Pietro Nenni (1891–1980): politician, the leader of Italian Socialist Party 1931–1945 and 1949–1963, deputy prime minister (Moro I, II and III cabinet), minister of foreign affairs (De Gasperi II cabinet, Rumor I cabinet)
 Benito Mussolini (1883–1945): fascist dictator of Italy.
 Palmiro Togliatti (1893–1964): politician, the leader of Italian Communist Party from 1927 to his death in 1964.
 Emma Bonino (1948–): politician, European Commissioner 1995–1999, minister of foreign trade and European affairs 2006–2008, Deputy Speaker of Italian Senate 2008–2013 and Minister of Foreign Affairs 2013–2014.

The Netherlands
 Jetta Klijnsma (1957–): Dutch politician from the Labour Party serving as the King's Commissioner of Drenthe since 2017.
 Clara Wichmann (1885–1922): German–Dutch lawyer, writer, anarcho-syndicalist, feminist, and atheist.
 Ayaan Hirsi Ali (1969–): Somali-Dutch feminist and atheist activist, writer and politician who is known for her views critical of Islam, practices of circumcision and female genital cutting.
 Renske Leijten (1979–): Politician of the Socialist Party and a member of the House of Representatives since 2006.
 Thierry Baudet (1983–): Dutch politician, academic, author, founder, and leader of Forum for Democracy (FvD), and has been a member of the House of Representatives since 2017. 
 Ronald Plasterk (1957–): Politician of the Labour Party (PvdA) and former molecular geneticist. He is Minister of the Interior and Kingdom Relations in the Cabinet Rutte II and was previously Minister of Education, Culture and Science from February 22, 2007, until February 23, 2010, in the Cabinet Balkenende IV.
 Lousewies van der Laan (1966–): Retired Dutch politician of the Democrats 66 (D66) party and jurist.
 Stephan van Baarle (1991–): Politician of the DENK party, serving as a member of the House of Representatives since 2021 and has been serving on the Rotterdam municipal council since 2018.
 Geert Wilders (1963–): Dutch businessman and politician that has been the Leader of the Party for Freedom (Partij voor de Vrijheid – PVV) since he founded it in 2006.

Poland
 Władysław Gomułka (1905–1982): Communist leader.
 Aleksander Kwaśniewski (1954–): former President of Poland (1995–2005).
 Zbigniew Religa (1938–2009): prominent cardiac surgeon, pioneer in human heart transplantation and a Minister of Health of the Republic of Poland.
 Włodzimierz Cimoszewicz (1950–): former Prime Minister of Poland (1996-1997)
 Leszek Miller (1946-): Prime Minister of Poland (2001-2004)
 Kazimierz Kutz (1929-2018): filmmaker, writer, adaemic, Senator (1997-2007, 2011-2015) and Sejm member (2007-2011)  
 Jacek Kuroń (1934-2004): political activist, presidential candidate, Minister of Labour and Social Policy (1989-1990, 1992-1993) and Sejm member (1989-2001) 
 Mariusz Kamiński (1965-): Minister of the Interior and Administration (2019-)  
 Michał Kamiński (1972-): MEP (2004-2007, 2009-2014), Sejm member (1997-2004, 2015-2019) and Senator  
 Gabriel Narutowicz (1865–1922): first President of Poland (1922).
 Robert Biedroń (1975–): Mayor of Słupsk, member of parliament, LGBT rights activist.
 Bolesław Bierut (1892–1956): Communist leader.

Portugal
 Ana Gomes (1954–): ambassador and former MEP and presidential candidate of the Socialist Party.
 António Marinho e Pinto (1950–): former President of the Portuguese Bar Association and MEP for the Earth Party, and founder of the Democratic Republican Party.
 Francisco Louçã (1956–): former Councillor of State, MP and leader of the Left Bloc.
 Isabel Moreira (1976–): jurist and Socialist Party MP.
 João Soares (1949–): former State Councillor, Minister of Culture and Mayor of Lisbon of the Socialist Party.
 Jorge Sampaio (1939–2021): lawyer, President of Portugal (1996–2006) and Mayor of Lisbon of the Socialist Party.
Manuel Soares (1964–): judge and President of the Portuguese Judges' Union.
 Miguel Portas (1958–2012): former Left Bloc MEP.
 Paula Teixeira da Cruz (1960–): lawyer and former Minister of Justice of the Social Democratic Party.
 Teófilo Braga (1843–1924): President of Portugal (1910–1911, 1915) of the Republican Party and the Democratic Party.

Romania
 Mihai Ralea (1896–1964): Social scientist, cultural journalist, and political figure that was affiliated with Poporanism, the left-wing agrarian movement. 
 Remus Cernea (1974–): Activist against discrimination based on faith and religion, an advocate of the separation of church and state.
 Paul Georgescu (1923–1989): Romanian literary critic, journalist, fiction writer and communist political figure.
 Alexandru Drăghici (1913–1993): Communist activist and politician.

Russia/Soviet Union
 Leonid Brezhnev (1906–1982): Soviet politician who was leader of the Soviet Union from 1964 until his death in 1982.
 Mikhail Gorbachev (1931-2022): Soviet politician who was the leader of the Soviet Union from 1985 until his resignation in 1991. Although he was suspected to be 'closeted Christian', he always denied that and kept reaffirming his atheism.
 Vladimir Ilyich Lenin (1870–1924): Marxist revolutionary and leader of the Bolsheviks. Lenin considered atheism and anti-religious propaganda to be essential to promoting communism.
 Nikita Khrushchev (1894–1971): Soviet General Secretary, 1953–1964.
 Joseph Stalin (1878–1953): General Secretary of the Communist Party of the Soviet Union's Central Committee from 1922 until his death in 1953.
 Leon Trotsky (1879–1940): Marxist theorist and Soviet politician.
 Yemelyan Yaroslavsky (1878–1943): Bolshevik revolutionary and founder of the League of Militant Atheists.

Spain
Non-religious politicians are very common in Spain, particularly in PSOE, Unidas Podemos, and the former Republican Left.

 Santiago Casares Quiroga (1884–1950): Politician, Prime Minister of Spain from May 13 to July 19, 1936.
 Pedro Sánchez (1972–): Politician, Prime Minister of Spain since June 1, 2018.
 Manuel Azaña (1880–1940): Prime Minister of Spain, 1931–1936.
 Pablo Iglesias (1978–): an atheist who served as Second Deputy Prime Minister of Spain 2020–2021, and as Secretary-General (leader) of Podemos since 2014.

Sweden
 Olof Palme (1927–1986): politician, two-term Prime Minister of Sweden, heading a Privy Council Government from 1969 to 1976 and a cabinet government from 1982 until his death.
 Bengt Westerberg (1943–): Leader of the Liberal People's Party from 1983 to 1995. Minister for Social Affairs and Deputy Prime Minister from 1991 to 1994. Currently holds office as the Deputy President of the International Federation of Red Cross and Red Crescent Societies in Geneva, Switzerland.
 Hanif Bali (1987–): politician of the Moderate Party and member of the Swedish Riksdag.

Turkey

 Abdullah Cevdet (1869–1932), Turkish intellectual and physician of ethnic Kurdish descent, who was a politician of the Committee of Union and Progress between 1889 and 1908 and then the Ottoman Democratic Party between 1908 and 1911.
 Behice Boran (1910–1987), Turkish Marxist politician, author, and sociologist, who was elected deputy of the Workers' Party of Turkey between 1965 and 1969.
 Bedri Baykam (1957–), Turkish artist and elected member of the Party Assembly of the social-democratic Republican People's Party between 1995 and 1998.

United Kingdom

Being non-religious has traditionally not been a barrier to success in British politics, as evidenced by at least four Prime Ministers, one Deputy Prime Minister, one First Minister of Wales, and several leaders of the Opposition being atheists since the 20th century. Non-religious views are common among British MPs and Lords, many of whom are members of the All-Party Parliamentary Humanist Group, as well as members of Scottish, Welsh, Northern Irish, and London legislatures.

 Clement Attlee (1883–1967): British politician who served as Prime Minister of the United Kingdom from 1945 to 1951 and Leader of the Labour Party from 1935 to 1955. 
 William Crawford Anderson (1877–1919): British socialist politician, a founder member of the Union of Democratic Control.
 James Arbuthnot (1952–): Conservative MP 1987-2015 and peer since 2015.
 Edward Aveling (1849–1898): English Marxist activist and partner of Karl Marx's daughter Eleanor.
 Bessie Braddock JP (1899–1970): British Labour politician, vice-chairman of the party in 1968.
 Charles Bradlaugh (1833–1891): Liberal politician and one of the most famous English atheists of the 19th century.
 Alastair Campbell (1957–): Director of Communications and Strategy for the Prime Minister of the United Kingdom from 1997 to 2003.
 James Cleverly (1969–): MP for Braintree from 2015 to present.
 Michael Cashman (1950–): British actor turned Labour politician, a former Member of the European Parliament (1999–2014).
 Colin Challen (1953–): British Labour politician, Member of Parliament (2001–2010).
 Charles Clarke (1950–): British Labour Party politician, Member of Parliament since 1997 and former Home Secretary.
 Nick Clegg (1967–): former Deputy Prime Minister of the United Kingdom, Lord President of the Council (with special responsibility for political and constitutional reform), and the British Liberal Democrat Leader from 2007 to 2015.
 Robin Cook (1946–2005): Secretary of State for Foreign & Commonwealth Affairs of the UK (1997–2001), whose funeral service was held in the High Kirk of Scotland, where he was described as a "Presbyterian atheist. "
 Meghnad Desai, Baron Desai (1940–): British economist, writer and Labour politician.
 Donald Dewar (1937–2000): British Politician and Scottish first minister, from May 1999 until his sudden death in October 2000
 Frank Dobson (1940–2019): British Labour politician and member of Parliament for Holborn and St. Pancras.
 Jack Dormand (1919–2003): British educationist and Labour politician.
 Herbert Fisher OM (1865–1940): English historian, educator, and Liberal politician.
 Donald Findlay QC (1951–): Senior Scottish advocate and Queen's Counsel.
 Shreela Flather, Baroness Flather (1934–): British Conservative peer in the House of Lords, the first Asian woman to receive a peerage.
 Michael Foot (1913–2010): British politician and writer, leader of the Labour Party 1980–1983.
 Sir George Taubman Goldie (1846–1925): Manx administrator who, as founder of the Royal Niger Company, played a major role in the founding of Nigeria.
 Evan Harris (1965–): British Liberal Democrat politician and former MP.
 Roy Hattersley PC (1932–): British Labour Party politician, author and journalist, Deputy Leader of the Labour Party 1983–1992.
 Douglas Houghton PC CH (1898–1996): British Labour politician.
 Robert Hughes, Baron Hughes of Woodside (1932–2022): British Labour politician.
 Tommy Jackson (1879–1955): English founder of the Socialist Party of Great Britain and later the Communist Party of Great Britain.
 Joel Joffe, Baron Joffe CBE (1932–2017): South Africa-born British Labour peer in the House of Lords.
 Oona King, Baroness King of Bow (1967–): Labour peer in the House of Lords, former MP for Bethnal Green and Bow (1997–2005).
 Neil Kinnock PC (1942–): British Labour politician, Leader of the Opposition and Labour Party leader 1983–1992.
 Ken Livingstone (1945–): Mayor of London 2000–08.
 Gus Macdonald, Baron Macdonald of Tradeston CBE, PC (1940–): British Labour politician.
 Ramsay Macdonald (1866–1937): Scottish politician who became the first Labour Prime Minister of the United Kingdom. Although devoutly religious in his childhood and as an early adult, he became a very involved member of the Union of Ethical Societies (an early humanist organisation, now known as Humanists UK) later on.
 John Maxton, Baron Maxton (1936–): Scottish politician, MP and now member of the House of Lords.
 David Miliband (1965–): British Labour politician, Foreign Secretary from 2007 to 2010.
 Ed Miliband (1969–): British Labour politician, Leader of the Opposition and Leader of the Labour Party from 2010 to 2015.
 Rhodri Morgan (1939–2017), former First Minister of Wales and leader of Welsh Labour (2000-2009).
 Julie Morgan (1941–): Welsh Assembly Member for Cardiff North and former MP for Cardiff North.
 John Morley, 1st Viscount Morley of Blackburn OM, PC (1838–1923): British Liberal statesman, writer and newspaper editor.
 Mo Mowlam (1949–2005): Former Secretary of State for Northern Ireland.
 Elaine Murphy, Baroness Murphy (1949–2005): British politician and a member of the House of Lords, and a doctor and academic, formerly Professor of Psychiatry of Old Age at Guy's Hospital.
 Marion Phillips (1881–1932): Australia-born Labour Party politician and British Member of Parliament.
 Phil Piratin (1907–1995): British member of the Communist Party of Great Britain (CPGB) and one of their few Members of Parliament.
 Herbert Samuel, 1st Viscount Samuel (1870–1963): Liberal Party Leader 1931–1935.
 Phil Sawford (1950–): British politician and former Member of Parliament for Kettering.
 Brian Sedgemore (1937–2015): former left-wing British Labour Party politician.
 Clare Short (1946–): British politician, former Labour Secretary of State for International Development.
 Dennis Skinner (1932–): British politician, who was the Labour Member of Parliament for Bolsover from 1970 until he lost his seat in 2019.
 Keir Starmer (1962–): Leader of the Labour Party and Leader of the Opposition since 2020.
 Guy Aldred (1886–1963): English anarchist communist and a prominent member of the Anti-Parliamentary Communist Federation.
 Peter Tatchell (1952–), Australian-born British human rights activist
 Phillip Whitehead (1937–2005): British Labour politician, television producer and writer.

Other in Europe
 Gaudenz Canova (1887–1962): Swiss lawyer and Social Democratic member of the National Council of Switzerland from Graubünden (Grisons).
 Dimitris Christofias (1946–2019): Greek Cypriot politician, President of Cyprus 2008–2013. 
 Vaso Čubrilović (1897–1990): Bosnian student, a conspirator in the assassination of Archduke Franz Ferdinand of Austria.
 Theodor Herzl (1860–1904): Austro-Hungarian Jewish journalist and founder of modern political Zionism.
 Zoran Janković (1953–): Slovenian businessman, former mayor of Ljubljana, the capital of Slovenia, and a deputy.
 Alexander Lukashenko (1954–): President of Belarus, describes himself as "an Orthodox atheist."
 Slobodan Milošević (1941–2006): Serbian politician, former President of Serbia and of Yugoslavia.
 Ivica Račan (1944–2007): Prime Minister of Croatia (2000–2003), former Croatian leftist politician who led the Social Democratic Party of Croatia between 1989 up to 2007. He was also the last leader and democratic transformer of the League of Communists of Croatia.
 Hedi Stadlen (1916–2004): Austrian Jewish political activist, philosopher and musicologist.
 Veton Surroi (1961–): Kosovo Albanian publicist and politician.
 Erkki Tuomioja (1946–): Finnish politician, Minister for Foreign Affairs 2000–2007 and 2011–2015.
 Josip Broz Tito (1892–1980) 1st President of Yugoslavia
 Zoran Milanović (1966–): Prime Minister of Croatia (2011-2016) and 5th President of Croatia (2020-)
 Miloš Zeman (1944–): President of the Czech Republic

North America

Canada 
 Armin Navabi (1983–): Iranian Canadian ex-Muslim atheist activist, author and podcaster, currently living in Vancouver, Canada.
 Gilles Duceppe (1947–): Politician, Leader of the Opposition twice from 1996 to 1997 and Leader of the Bloc Québécois from 1997 to 2011.
 David Lewis (1909–1981): Canadian labour lawyer and social democratic politician.
 Dale Jackaman (1956–): Politician.
 Sarah Polley (1979–): Canadian actress, writer, director, producer and political activist.
 Pauline Marois (1949–): Premier of Quebec from 2012 to 2014, leader of Parti Québécois from 2007 to 2014.
 Françoise David (1948–): Spokesperson and MNA for Quebec Solidaire.
 Justin Trottier (1982–): Political activist, former political candidate and founder of Canada's largest social-political movements for secularism and men's issues.
 Norman Bethune (1890–1939): Canadian thoracic surgeon and member of the Communist Party of Canada.
 Nathan Phelps (1958–): American-born Canadian author, LGBT rights activist, and public speaker on the topics of religion and child abuse.
 Yasmine Mohammed, University instructor, human rights activist and author who is critical of Islam.

Costa Rica
 Ricardo Jiménez Oreamuno (1859–1945), three times President of Costa Rica.
 José Figueres Ferrer (1906–1990), three times President of Costa Rica.
 José Merino (1949–2012), left-wing activist and deputy.
 José María Villalta (1977–), deputy and presidential candidate.

Cuba 
 Fidel Castro (1926–2016): First Secretary of the Communist Party of Cuba, Prime Minister of Cuba, and President of Cuba, all from 1959 to 2011.
 Raúl Castro (1931–): First Secretary of the Communist Party of Cuba from 2011 to 2021.

Mexico 
 Carlos A. Madrazo (1915–1969): Politician.
 Narciso Bassols (1897–1959): Politician.
 Lázaro Cárdenas (1895–1970): 51st President of Mexico.
 Venustiano Carranza (1859–1920): 44th President of Mexico.
 Plutarco Elías Calles (1877–1945): 47th President of Mexico.
 Tomás Garrido Canabal (1891–1943): Politician.
 Benito Juarez (1806–1872): 26th President of Mexico.
 Alvaro Obregon (1880–1928): 46th President of Mexico.

United States 

 Rocky Anderson (1951–): 2012 Justice Party Presidential Candidate and former mayor of Salt Lake City, Utah
 Cecil Bothwell (1950–): Asheville, North Carolina city council member, who was nearly denied his position because of his atheism.
 Lori Lipman Brown (1958–): politician, lobbyist, lawyer, educator, and social worker supporter, Nevada state senator from 1992 to 1994.
 Douglas Campbell (1959–): atheist advocate and member of the Green Party of Michigan and of the Godless Americans Political Action Committee. Co-founder, Michigan Godless Americans Political Action Committee. Green Party candidate for governor of Michigan in both 2002 and 2006.
 Ernie Chambers (1937–): Member of the Nebraska Legislature and civil rights activist.
 Clarence Darrow (1857–1938): lawyer and leading member of the American Civil Liberties Union, best known for defending John T. Scopes in the so-called Monkey Trial.
 Sean Faircloth (1960–): attorney, served five terms in the Maine Legislature including appointments on the Judiciary and Appropriations Committees.
 Barney Frank (1940–): U.S. Representative (1981–2013) (D-MA).
 Thomas Gore (1870–1949): United States Senator (D-OK), from 1907 until 1921 and from 1931 until 1937.
 Vincent Hallinan (1896–1992): lawyer who ran for president of the United States in 1952 under the Progressive Party, the third highest polling candidate in the election.
 Jared Huffman (1964–): United States Congressman (D-CA) since 2013. He revealed in 2017 that he is a humanist and a non-believer. The second openly non-religious member of congress and the only currently serving in House or Senate
 Heather Mac Donald (1956–): writer and lawyer, member of the Manhattan Institute and author of The Burden of Bad Ideas: How Modern Intellectuals Misshape Our Society.
 Culbert Olson (1876–1962): politician and Governor of California from 1939 to 1943.
 Pete Stark (1931–2020): U.S. Representative (1973–2013) (D-CA), the first openly atheist member of Congress.
 Eddie Tabash: lawyer and atheist activist and debater.
 Jesse Ventura (1951–): former Governor of Minnesota, veteran, wrestler, actor, and talk show host.
 George Will (1941–): newspaper columnist and political commentator
 Alan Wolfe (1951–): Political scientist and sociologist, director of the Boisi Center for Religion and American Public Life.
 Andrew Zwicker (1964–): Member of the New Jersey General Assembly; scientist and educator, Princeton Plasma Physics Laboratory.
 Juan Mendez (1985–): State Senator for Arizona.

South America

Argentina 
 Carmen Argibay (1939–2014): Lawyer, member of the Argentine Supreme Court of Justice, the first woman to be nominated for the Court by a democratic government in Argentina.
 Che Guevara (1928–1967): Marxist revolutionary.

Guyana 
 Janet Jagan (1920–2009): American-born socialist politician, Prime Minister and then President of Guyana.

Paraguay 
 José Gaspar Rodríguez de Francia (1766–1840): Dictator of Paraguay between 1814 and 1840.

Uruguay 
 José Mujica (1935–): Politician and President of Uruguay from 2010 to 2015.

Notes and references 

Politics and law